{{Infobox weapon
|image=Victory_32pdr_gundeck_(5694565962).jpg|size=thumb
|caption=32-pounder 56 cwt guns (replicas) on HMS ''Victorys gundeck
|name=32-pounder 56 cwt|type=Naval gun Coast Defense gun
|origin=United Kingdom
|is_ranged=Yes
|is_artillery=Yes
|is_UK=Yes
|designer=Thomas Blomefield
|design_date=1790s
|production_date=1790s-1830s
|used_by=United Kingdom
|service=1790s-after 1865
|wars=French Revolutionary wars, Napoleonic Wars, Crimean War
|number=in excess of 3,694
|length=
|weight=56 cwt
|cartridge=Solid Shot
|cartridge_weight=}}
The 32-pounder 56 cwt''' cannon was an artillery piece designed and used by the British Armed Forces in the late 18th and early 19th centuries. It was by far the most common 32-pounder used by the Royal Navy in the Napoleonic Wars, with 1961 guns being recorded as in use and 1733 being in storage at the end of March 1857. Sir Thomas Blomefield designed the cannon in the late 1780s and early 1790s as part of his system of gun construction. It was the heaviest cannon used by ships of the Royal Navy from the 1790s to the late 1830s, and it was used on the lower decks of ships of the line such as HMS Victory.

References 

Cannon
Naval guns of the United Kingdom